Psychedelicatessen is the third studio album by Australian noise rock band Lubricated Goat, released in 1990 by Black Eye Records and Amphetamine Reptile Records.

Release and reception
AllMusic staff writer Skip Jansen gave the album 4 out of 5 stars, praising it as being "classic noise rock in the vein of Helios Creed, the Jesus Lizard, and Halo of Flies".

Track listing

Personnel
Adapted from the Psychedelicatessen liner notes.

Lubricated Goat
Martin Bland – drums, synthesizer
Renastair E. J. – guitar, saxophone
Lachlan McCleod – sampler
Stu Spasm – vocals, guitar, bass guitar, synthesizer

Production and additional personnel
Don Bartley – mastering
Lubricated Goat – production
Phil Punch – production, recording, engineering

Release history

References

External links 
 

1990 albums
Lubricated Goat albums
Amphetamine Reptile Records albums